The Remezov Letopis (Ремезовская летопись in Russian) is one of the Siberian Letopises, compiled by a Russian historian Semyon Remezov in the late 17th century.

East Slavic chronicles
History of Siberia
17th-century history books